David Keynes Hill FRS (23 July 1915 – 18 August 2002) was a British biophysicist.

Hill was the son of Nobel Prize–winning physiologist Archibald Vivian Hill and his wife Margaret Hill, the daughter of John Neville Keynes and sister of John Maynard Keynes.  His sister was economist Polly Hill and his brother the oceanographer Maurice Hill. He was educated at Highgate School and Trinity College, Cambridge.

He married Stella Mary Humphrey, 1949, and they had four daughters; Harriet, Abbie, Maggie and Katy.

He was elected a Fellow of the Royal Society in 1972.

References

External links
Obituary

1915 births
2002 deaths
English biophysicists
Fellows of the Royal Society
Keynes family
People educated at Highgate School
The Journal of Physiology editors